Safety in Numbers is a 1938 American comedy film directed by Malcolm St. Clair and starring Jed Prouty, Shirley Deane and Spring Byington. It was part of Twentieth Century Fox's Jones Family series.

Cast

References

Bibliography
 Bernard A. Drew. Motion Picture Series and Sequels: A Reference Guide. Routledge, 2013.

External links
 
 
 

1938 films
1938 comedy films
American comedy films
Films directed by Malcolm St. Clair
20th Century Fox films
American black-and-white films
1930s English-language films
1930s American films